Brian Kalk (born c. 1966) is a North Dakota Republican Party politician in the U.S. state of North Dakota. He served on the North Dakota Public Service Commission from 2009 to 2017.

Early life
Kalk was born and raised in Bottineau, North Dakota and graduated from Bottineau High School in 1984. He was class President in Bottineau his Freshman and Senior years of high school. While in High School he was active in the FFA, Hockey, Football, Track, and Choir. Kalk graduated in the top 10% of his class.  Following High School graduation he attended Dakota College at Bottineau where he played hockey for the "Lumber Jacks" and studied Political Science and Natural Resources until his enlistment in the Marine Corps in 1987.

Marines
Kalk served as a Marine from 1987 until his retirement. During his years as a Marine, he traveled to over forty countries. Kalk served in many operations including Operation Enduring Freedom, and Operation Iraqi Freedom.  While serving, he received his bachelor's degree in Political Science from Campbell University in North Carolina. In 2003, Kalk deployed as the Forward Operations Officer for Transportation Support Group One.  In 2003, he returned to North Dakota to command the Fargo Military Entrance Processing Station.  While in Fargo, he received his Doctorate Degree from North Dakota State University in Natural Resource Management.  He then taught different courses at NDSU.

Politics
In January 2008, Kalk announced his campaign for the Republican nomination for the Public Service Commission.  He won in the general election and has focused on job creation utilizing the state's natural resources.  Kalk was re-elected in 2014. Kalk resigned in January 2017 to accept a position at the Energy and Environmental Research Center until April of 2019 when Kalk was named the Executive Director of the North Dakota State University Research and Technology Park.

Personal life
Kalk and his wife Karen have a daughter. He is active in organizations such as the American Legion, the Marine Corps League, the Veterans of Foreign Wars, and the American Veterans.

References

1960s births
Living people
People from Bottineau County, North Dakota
Campbell University alumni
North Dakota State University alumni
United States Marine Corps officers
North Dakota Public Service Commissioners